Christopher Britz (born 1 September 1998) is a South African cricketer. He made his List A debut on 21 March 2021, for North West in the 2020–21 CSA Provincial One-Day Challenge. Later the same month, he made his first-class debut in the 2020–21 CSA 3-Day Provincial Cup.

References

External links
 

1998 births
Living people
South African cricketers
North West cricketers
Place of birth missing (living people)